Urinary diversion is any one of several surgical procedures to reroute urine flow from its normal pathway. It may be necessary for diseased or defective ureters, bladder or urethra, either temporarily or permanently. Some diversions result in a stoma.

Types
 Nephrostomy from the renal pelvis
 Urostomy from more distal origins along the urinary tract, with subtypes including:
 Ileal conduit urinary diversion (Bricker conduit)
 Indiana pouch
 Neobladder to urethra diversion

Ureteroenteric anastomosis
A common feature of the three first, and most common, types of urinary diversion is the ureteroenteric anastomosis. This is the joining site of the ureters and the section of intestine used for the diversion.

The ureteroenteric anastomosis can be created in a number of different ways. There is the option of a refluxing or a non-refluxing type, and the two ureters can be joined into the intestinal segment either together or separately. The non-refluxing type has been associated with higher incidence of ureteroenteric anastomosis stricture, and there is doubt whether it has any advantages over the refluxing type. Therefore, many surgeons prefer the refluxing type which is simpler and apparently carries a lesser degree of complications.

Refluxing techniques include the Wallace and Wallace II and the Bricker end-to-side anastomosis. Non-refluxing techniques includes the Le Duc technique.

Complications
Complications include incisional hernia, neobladder-intestinal and neobladder-cutaneous fistulas, ureteroenteric anastomosis stricture, neobladder rupture and mucous formation. Ureteral diversion can lead to normal anion gap acidosis.

See also
 Surgical anastomosis

References

External links
 eMedicine: Urinary Diversions and Neobladders

Urologic surgery